Charles Kunje (born 27 May 1994) is a Zimbabwean cricketer. He made his Twenty20 debut for Matabeleland Tuskers in the 2018–19 Stanbic Bank 20 Series on 11 March 2019. In December 2020, he was selected to play for the Rhinos in the 2020–21 Logan Cup.

References

External links
 

1994 births
Living people
Zimbabwean cricketers
Matabeleland Tuskers cricketers
Mountaineers cricketers
Southern Rocks cricketers
Mid West Rhinos cricketers
Sportspeople from Harare